Gustavs Vanags (10 March 1891 — 8 May 1965) was a Soviet and Latvian organic chemist, full member of Latvian SSR Academy of Sciences. He was also one of the signers of the Memorandum of Latvian Central Council in 1944.

Biography 
Gustavs Vanags was born in "Rungas" house of the Schnicken (Sniķeru) manor (now in Ukri Parish, Auce Municipality). He received primary education in the Mitau Classic Gymnasium, and in 1910 enrolled Riga Polytechnic Institute. During the First World War, he, among many, went in evacuation to the inner regions of Russian Empire; after returning from it in 1921, he completed his education in the new-founded University of Latvia and worked at the Faculty of Chemistry, raising to the position of the chair of the Department of organic chemistry. He received his habilitation in 1932.

After Riga Polytechnic Institute was reestablished in 1958, G. Vanags moved to it, serving in the same position as the department chair until 1965. Simultaneously he also worked in the State Institute of Organic Synthesis, where he carried out his research in the chemistry of cyclic β-diketones. He was founder of Riga scholl of organic chemists specializing on β-diketones, which continues up to day (2020). Gustavs Vanags, along with his students, designed and synthesized several compounds of notable application in medicine, agriculture and chemical analysis (omefin, bindon, nitroindandione, rhodenticide diphenadione or ratindan).

Gustavs Vanags died in a sudden death on May 8th, 1965, in Riga. He was buried in the Forest Cemetery.

Commemoration 
Latvian Academy of Sciences named a biannual prize for advances in chemistry in Gustavs Vanags' name.

A commemorative plaque with bas-relief of G. Vanags is installed in the hall of Riga Technical University Faculty of Chemistry. A commemorative stone is erected at the place where his native house of "Rungas" once stood.

References

External links 
 Article in Letonika encyclopedia 
 Exhibition "Gustavs Vanags and organic chemistry in Latvia

1891 births
1965 deaths
20th-century chemists
20th-century Latvian inventors
People from Auce Municipality
People from Kovno Governorate
People from Zemgale
Academicians of the Latvian SSR Academy of Sciences
Riga Technical University alumni
Academic staff of Riga Technical University
University of Latvia alumni
Academic staff of the University of Latvia
Recipients of the Order of the Red Banner of Labour
Latvian chemists

Latvian inventors
Soviet chemists
Soviet inventors